Hot Snakes are an American post-hardcore band led by Rick Froberg and John Reis, formed in 1999 in San Diego, California. Reis and Froberg had previously performed together in Pitchfork and Drive Like Jehu, after which Reis had found international success with Rocket from the Crypt. Hot Snakes disbanded in 2005 but reunited in 2011.

Although they share musical similarities with members' previous outfits, Hot Snakes have a sound that is much more primal than that of Pitchfork, Drive Like Jehu or even Rocket from the Crypt. Reis and Froberg were also heavily influenced by bands such as The Wipers, Suicide, and Michael Yonkers Band, and these influences gave Hot Snakes a distinctive sound that has been described by one critic as "hardcore garage punk." The band's recordings and merchandise were produced using principles of DIY, with Froberg providing all of the artwork and Reis releasing the material via his Swami Records label.

History

1999–2001: Formation and Automatic Midnight
As youths growing up in San Diego, Reis and Froberg had played together in the post-hardcore band Pitchfork from 1986 to 1990. Following that they formed Drive Like Jehu, which gained the attention of major labels and resulted in a record contract with Interscope Records. By this time, however, Reis had become seriously involved with his other band, Rocket from the Crypt, and in 1995 Drive Like Jehu stopped playing together. Reis would continue to work with Rocket From the Crypt until 2005, while Froberg moved to New York to start a career as visual artist and illustrator.

Hot Snakes essentially began as a "side project" in 1999 while Reis was taking time off from Rocket from the Crypt, who were in between record labels and had lost their longtime drummer Atom Willard. While searching for a new record label and drummer, Reis started his own label Swami Records and experimented with other musicians, resulting in the formation of both Hot Snakes and the Sultans. Hot Snakes originated when Reis recorded a batch of songs with The Delta 72 drummer Jason Kourkounis, then contacted former bandmate Froberg to contribute vocals to the tracks. Most of this recording session was released in 2000 as Hot Snakes' first album Automatic Midnight, which was the first release by the Swami label.

Although Reis and Froberg had previously collaborated in bands, Hot Snakes represented a new challenge logistically: Reis lived in San Diego, Froberg in New York, and Kourkounis in Philadelphia. This resulted in sporadic and intense touring and recording schedules. When a full touring band was needed, Gar Wood (Beehive and the Baracudas, Tanner, Fishwife) was called in to play the bass guitar. After some touring Reis returned to work full-time with Rocket from the Crypt.

2002–04: Suicide Invoice and Audit in Progress
In 2002 Hot Snakes reconvened to record the album Suicide Invoice and tour the United States. The following year Kourkounis left the band to play full-time with Burning Brides, and Reis once again returned to work with Rocket from the Crypt. When Hot Snakes again returned to the recording studio in 2004, Rocket from the Crypt drummer Mario Rubalcaba (also of The Black Heart Procession, Clikatat Ikatowi, Earthless, 411, and Chicanochrist) was brought in to play the drums. The album Audit in Progress was released and the band extensively toured the United States, as well as Europe and Australia.

While on tour in the United Kingdom that fall, the band recorded several songs for BBC radio at British DJ John Peel's recording studio. Their performance would be one of the last for Peel's program, as he died shortly afterwards. This session was released as the Peel Sessions EP, which replaced a planned single for the song "Braintrust" in the UK market.

2005–06: Breakup and Thunder Down Under

In May 2005, while on tour in Australia, Hot Snakes recorded a live in-studio performance at ABC studios for Australian radio station JJJ. On their return to the US, Reis announced that the band was breaking up. Audit in Progress was named "best punk album" at the 2005 San Diego Music Awards, and shortly after Reis announced that Rocket from the Crypt would also be breaking up. That fall, Hot Snakes contributed a cover of the Government Issue song "Time to Escape" to the soundtrack to the Tony Hawk's American Wasteland video game. This was the last song recorded by the band. Their live Australian radio session was released posthumously in 2006 as Thunder Down Under.

Following the breakup of both Hot Snakes and Rocket from the Crypt, Reis focused his energy on running the Swami Records label. He continued to perform occasionally with Rubalcaba in the Sultans until that band's breakup in January 2007. Rubalcaba also plays in the San Diego band Earthless and is part owner of an independent record store called Thirsty Moon Records. Wood continues to record music and play in Beehive and the Barracudas, while Froberg resides in New York and works as a visual artist and illustrator. In early 2008 Froberg debuted a new musical act called Obits, while Reis, Wood, and Kourkounis reunited in The Night Marchers.

2010–present: Reunion
On July 29, 2010 The Night Marchers and Obits performed together at The Casbah in San Diego; for the encore, the original Hot Snakes lineup of Reis, Froberg, Wood, and Kourkounis reunited to perform "If Credit's What Matters I'll Take Credit", "Automatic Midnight", and "No Hands". The following year Hot Snakes reunited, with Kourkounis and Rubalcaba taking turns on drums, for a series of gigs including All Tomorrow's Parties and Fun Fun Fun Fest. The band toured the West Coast of the United States from March to April 2012, and performed at the Metallica-curated Orion Music + More festival in New Jersey in June.

On August 14, 2017, Hot Snakes announced a fall tour starting in November as well as new album tentatively scheduled for release in spring 2018 via Sub Pop. Hot Snakes' discography is also scheduled to be reissued by Sub Pop. As promised Jericho Sirens was released in 2018 to positive reviews.

Band members 

 Rick Froberg – guitar, lead vocals (1999–2005, 2011–present)
 John Reis – guitar, backing vocals (1999–2005, 2011–present)
 Gar Wood – bass, backing vocals (1999–2005, 2011–present)
 Jason Kourkounis – drums (1999–2003, 2011–present)
 Mario Rubalcaba – drums (2003–05, 2011–present)

Discography

Hot Snakes' discography consists of four studio albums, one live album, one EP, six singles, and three music videos.

Studio albums

Live albums

Extended plays

Singles

Music videos

Other appearances
The following Hot Snakes songs were released on compilation albums. This is not an exhaustive list; songs that were first released on the band's albums are not included.

References

External links

 Official Website
 Swami Records band profile
 Swami Records

1999 establishments in California
Musical groups disestablished in 2005
Musical groups established in 1999
Musical groups reestablished in 2011
American post-hardcore musical groups
Musical groups from San Diego
Musical quintets
Sub Pop artists
Swami Records artists